The Gospels of Lothair (BNF Lat. 266) is an evangeliary made for Lothair I
in Saint-Martin de Tours during 849 to 851.
Representing the peak of the Carolingian Tours workshop, the manuscript has 221 parchment leaves written in gold ink, 
with six miniatures, nine incipit pages, twelve altar cards, 18 index pages and five initials.

A different Carolingian evangeliary, the so-called Cleves Evangeliary (Berlin Staatsbibliothek Ms. theol. Lat. 260) was completed before 852, likely in a workshop at Lothair's court in Aachen.
It consists of 241 parchment leaves, written in gold ink.
This manuscript was given by Lothair to Prüm Abbey. It was acquired by the 
BNF in 1802 (following the dissolution of the Abbey following the French annexation in 1794) and returned to Germany in 1819. In the course of the negotiations for the manuscript's return, it became mixed up with an unrelated evangeliary of Cleves, and there is a note in the hand of Jacob Grimm attached to fol. 1r calling it the Evangeliar aus Kleve. The current name of this manuscript is based on this misidentification, but it has been kept because the alternative name "Lothair Evangeliary" would lead to confusion with BNF Lat. 266).

See also

Key works of Carolingian illumination

References

Florentine Mütherich, Joachim E. Gaehde, Karolingische Buchmalerei, 1979,  82-87.
Ingo F. Walther, Norbert Wolf, Meisterwerke der Buchmalere, 2005, p. 460.

Carolingian illuminated manuscripts
Bibliothèque nationale de France collections